Up, Into The Singing Mountain is a 1960 novel by Richard Llewellyn, and a sequel to his 1939 novel, How Green Was My Valley.

The novel tells the story of Huw Morgan's emigration to Patagonia.

Plot summary
Leaving South Wales, Huw travels to Liverpool where he boards the ship Geraint and travels to the Welsh-speaking colony of Patagonia.

Settling in the City of Lewis, Huw sets up a workshop, funded by his landlady, Widow Gwyn, and has success making furniture and fittings for houses. Huw meets the Corwen family, consisting of a widowed man with three daughters, the eldest of whom, Lal, Huw falls in love with. She is hesitant to marry him and her violent father, Vrann, has plans to marry her off to other farmers to get their land. As time passes, Huw encounters similar prejudices as those  found at home from the religious elders of the city, known as 'The Twelve'. 

Despite being in love with Lal, he begins a sexual relationship with Gwyn. Lal becomes distant with him and Gwyn expects marriage. When Huw refuses to marry her, Gwyn throws him out of her house.

Setting up a workshop elsewhere, Huw is reconciled with Lal and they talk of marriage, though Lal wants her share of the family farm agreeing first. Huw finds himself clashing with The Twelve and his progress in buying land for a farm impeded. After threatening a farmer who Huw thought was trying to con him over the sale of his farm, Huw is summoned to appear before The Twelve. They find Huw innocent of the charges put against him  but the votes were not unanimous.

The town is ravaged by a storm and flooding. Nelya Penninah tries to entice Huw by coming to his house needing help, but it turns out to be a trap and Matti Mumpo (her father, and one of the Twelve) bursts into the house. Mumpo  wants to have Huw thrown out of the valley.

Later, Huw's horse has its tongue cut out and a witness claims it was Nelya Penninah accompanied by a mysterious figure. The same night Huw meets up with Gruffyd, who says that not only is Angharad coming over to Patagonia, but she is bringing Bronwyn, too.

Huw spends several days up at the Corwen farm, trying to reinforce the dam with scores of other locals to stop it flooding the town. During this time, Gwyn's sister arrives to say Gwyn thinks she is pregnant with his child. Huw meets Gwyn but refuses to marry her.

On his way back, Huw meets with a stranger who offers him money to marry Doli Corwen. Seeking out Lal's father, Huw's request to marry Lal is rejected. The next day, Huw is summoned to the Corwen farm but is attacked and knocked unconscious on his arrival. He wakes to find himself, tied up and  a prisoner of Vrann Corwen, along with his three daughters who have been whipped by Vrann.

Vrann tries to kill Huw, but is stopped by Ithel and Michaye. The girls are released and tell their father they want nothing to do with him. The dam bursts shortly afterwards, flooding parts of they valley and city below.

Lal's sister, Doli, and her friend Kankel are arrested for cutting the tongue of the horse belonging to Mari Ann Gwythir and are imprisoned, despite protesting their innocence. Huw, along with Lal and some others go to the prison to break out Doli and Kankel but when they get there they interrupt a meeting of The Twelve. Huw, Lal and the others are remanded to stay in prison until the following day whilst investigations take place, but afterwards, are allowed to sneak out on the condition they are back for the morning.

Huw meets with Matti Mumpo, who tells Huw he wants to marry Lal. When Huw catches up with Lal she says she will marry Matti in the morning and then move to Buenos Aires as her father has gambled away the farm and Lal wants them to have something to own.

Later, Huw hears a commotion and sees Nelya Peninnah being brought in, restrained and on the back of a horse. Matti Mumpo rushes out to meet her but is killed by the crowd. Huw announces he will move to the Andes. He sets off the next day with Lal and some other families for the City of Mill.

Characters
Huw Morgan, the narrator
Merddyn Gruffydd, a former preacher who Huw knew from his childhood in Wales. Gruffydd left for Patagonia when rumours about him and Huw's sister, Angharad, spread around their village.
Morwen Glyn, a widow who Huw lodges with in the City of Lewis and whose land Huw builds his workshop upon.
Mari Ann Gwythir, a Welsh lady who has lived in Patagonia For 35 years. Huw meets her when he first arrives. Sister to Morwen Glyn.
Lal Corwen, daughter of a wealthy local farmer.
Doli Corwen, sister to Lal.
Solva Corwen, youngest sister of Lal.
Vrann Corwen, a wealthy farmer and landowner.
Matithiah Morse, one of The Twelve, nicknamed Matti Mumpo.
Nelya Penninah, daughter of Matti Mumpo.

Sequels
The author continued the story of Huw Morgan's life in two further sequels:

Down Where the Moon is Small (1966) – Huw's life in Argentina
Green, Green My Valley Now (1975) – Huw returns to Wales

References

1960 British novels
Anglo-Welsh novels
Michael Joseph books
Novels by Richard Llewellyn